Verkhnetolucheyevo is a rural locality (a selo) in Beryozovskoye Rural Settlement, Vorobyovsky District, Voronezh Oblast, Russia. The population was 270 as of 2010. There are 3 streets.

Geography 
Verkhnetolucheyevo is located 18 km northeast of Vorobyovka (the district's administrative centre) by road. Muzhichye is the nearest rural locality.

References 

Rural localities in Vorobyovsky District